Goatwhore is an American extreme metal band formed in New Orleans, Louisiana in 1997.

Biography
Goatwhore was formed by guitarist/backing vocalist Sammy Duet, who was previously the lead guitarist for Louisiana sludge metal band Acid Bath. The band's origins can date back to 1991 with Sammy and drummer Zak Nolan. The band was at the time called "Killgore" with Duet on lead guitar and vocals and Zak Nolan on drums. Killgore would release a number of demos up until 1997 when they changed their name to Goatwhore, after Acid Bath dissolved due to the death of bassist Audie Pitre. Soilent Green lead vocalist Louis Benjamin Falgoust II, rhythm guitarist Ben Stout and bassist Pat Bruders completed the lineup, which debuted with the demo Serenades to the Tides of Blood; Goatwhore's official debut LP, The Eclipse of Ages into Black, followed in early 2000. Funeral Dirge for the Rotting Sun appeared in 2003 before the band jumped to Metal Blade for the fall release of 2006's A Haunting Curse.

They performed at both Ozzfest 2008 and Ozzfest 2010.

In 2009, Goatwhore released their fourth album, Carving Out the Eyes of God, and toured with Obituary, among others.

In January and February 2010, Goatwhore embarked on the 'Bound by the Road' tour with DevilDriver, Suffocation, and Thy Will Be Done.

In 2010, the band was confirmed as being part of the soundtrack for Namco Bandai Games' 2010 remake of the video game Splatterhouse.

In early 2012, the band released their fifth album, Blood for the Master.

On March 10, 2014, the band completed recording their sixth album, titled Constricting Rage of the Merciless, which was released on July 8, 2014.

On September 11, 2014, bassist James Harvey decided to sit out touring, due to the birth of his son, so Robert Coleman was hired to fill in for him on live shows.

Vengeful Ascension was released on June 23, 2017. It was the last album to feature James Harvey on bass, who departed the band the same year, and was replaced by Robert Coleman after serving as the band's live bassist since 2014.

Lyrical themes
Goatwhore songs often contain themes of Satanism, witchcraft, anti-Christianity, and the occult. The band has also talked about Armageddon and The Holocaust in their last two albums.

Band members
Current members
Sammy Duet – guitars, backing vocals 
L. Ben Falgoust II – lead vocals 
Zack Simmons – drums 
Robert "Trans Am" Coleman – bass 

Touring members
Sam "Samus" Paulicelli – bass 

Former members
Ben Stout – guitars 
Zak Nolan – drums 
Pat Bruders – bass 
Tim Holsinger – guitars 
Nathan Bergeron – bass, backing vocals 
Jared Benoit – lead vocals 
James Harvey – bass

Timeline

Discography

Studio albums
The Eclipse of Ages into Black (2000)
Funeral Dirge for the Rotting Sun (2003)
A Haunting Curse (2006)
Carving Out the Eyes of God (2009)
Blood for the Master (2012)
Constricting Rage of the Merciless (2014)
Vengeful Ascension (2017)
Angels Hung from the Arches of Heaven (2022)

Split albums
Goatwhore / Epoch of Unlight (2003)

Singles
"(Don't Need) Religion" (2011)
"Command to Destroy" (2017)

Demos
Serenades to the Tides of Blood (1998)

References

External links

Official website

Blackened death metal musical groups
American black metal musical groups
American death metal musical groups
American thrash metal musical groups
Heavy metal musical groups from Louisiana
Musical groups established in 1997
Musical quartets
1997 establishments in Louisiana
Metal Blade Records artists